Laetilia is a genus of snout moths. It was described by Émile Louis Ragonot in 1889.

Biology
The larvae feed on various scale insects and occasionally flowers of scale infested plants.

Species
 Laetilia amphimetra Meyrick, 1939
 Laetilia bellivorella Neunzig, 1997
 Laetilia cinerosella Neunzig, 1997
 Laetilia coccidivora (Comstock, 1879)
 Laetilia dilatifasciella (Ragonot, 1887)
 Laetilia ephestiella (Ragonot, 1887)
 Laetilia fiskella Dyar, 1904
 Laetilia glomis (Dyar, 1914)
 Laetilia hebraica de Joannis, 1927
 Laetilia hulstii Cockerell, 1897
 Laetilia loxogramma (Staudinger, 1870)
 Laetilia melanostathma Meyrick, 1937
 Laetilia myersella Dyar, 1910
 Laetilia obscura Dyar, 1918
 Laetilia portoricensis Dyar, 1915
 Laetilia zamacrella Dyar, 1925

References

Phycitini
Pyralidae genera
Taxa named by Émile Louis Ragonot